Boyz n da Hood is the debut studio album by American Southern hip hop group Boyz n da Hood. It was released on June 21, 2005 through Bad Boy South/Atlantic Records with Jeezy's labels CTE & Def Jam. Recording sessions took place at Sho'Nuff Studios, PatchWerk Recording Studios, The Zone, 730 Beat Street, Futuristic Recording Studios and D.A.R.P. Studios in Atlanta and at Circle House Studios in Miami. Production was handled by Jazze Pha, Nitti, Drumma Boy, Crown Kingz Productions, DJ Toomp, Erick Sermon, Horace "Bubba" Mitchell, Jasper Cameron, Keith Mack, Midnight Black, Sanchez Holmes and Swizzo, with P. Diddy and Russell Spencer serving as executive producers. It features guest appearances from Eazy-E, Jazze Pha, Puff Daddy, Rick Ross and Young Malice. The album peaked at number 5 on the Billboard 200 and number-one on both Top R&B/Hip-Hop Albums and Top Rap Albums charts in the United States. Its lead single, "Dem Boyz", reached number #13 on the Hot Rap Songs chart.

Track listing

Charts

Weekly charts

Year-end charts

References

External links

See also
List of Billboard number-one R&B albums of 2005
List of number-one rap albums of 2005 (U.S.)

2005 debut albums
Boyz n da Hood albums
Bad Boy Records albums
Albums produced by DJ Toomp
Albums produced by Jazze Pha
Albums produced by Drumma Boy
Albums produced by Erick Sermon